CRRC Chengdu Co., Ltd. , is a railway rolling stock manufacturing company, a subsidiary of CRRC, which is located in Chengdu, Sichuan China, established in 1952, as Chengdu Locomotive & Rolling Stock Plant. In 2007 the company was affiliated in CSR, and renamed CSR 
Chengdu Locomotive & Rolling Stock Co. Ltd.. In 2015, as of the merger of CSR and CNR, CRRC was established, the company was renamed.

References

External links
  

Companies based in Chengdu
CRRC Group